Buenavista de Cuéllar is one of the 81 municipalities of Guerrero, in south-western Mexico. The municipal seat is Buenavista de Cuéllar. The municipality covers an area of 338.1 km².

In 2005, the municipality had a total population of 12,148.

References

Municipalities of Guerrero

vi:Buenavista de Cuéllar